Imre Farkas (May 1, 1879 in Debrecen, Austria-Hungary – March 25, 1976 in Budapest, Hungarian People's Republic) was a 19th-century Hungarian musician, most famous for his contribution for the popular Nóta style.

Hungarian composers
Hungarian male composers
19th-century Hungarian musicians
1879 births
1976 deaths
19th-century male musicians